An original soundtrack is recorded music accompanying and synchronized to the images of a motion picture, television program, or video game.

Original Soundtrack may also refer to the following:

 The Original Soundtrack, a 1975 rock album by 10cc
 Original Soundtrack (album), a 1989 acid house album by S'Express
 Original Soundtracks 1, a 1995 album by U2